East Suffolk may refer to the following places in Suffolk, England:

 East Suffolk (county), a county until 1974
 East Suffolk District, a local government district established in 2019
 East Suffolk (UK Parliament constituency), an electoral district from 1832 until 1885
 the eastern part of Suffolk
 East Suffolk line, a railway line

See also 
 Suffolk (disambiguation)